The 2011 ITM Hamilton 400 was a motor race for the Australian sedan-based V8 Supercars. It was the third event of the 2011 International V8 Supercars Championship. It was held on the weekend of 15–17 April at the Hamilton Street Circuit, in Hamilton, New Zealand. It was the fourth running of the Hamilton 400. The weekend saw two first time winners: Rick Kelly took the first victory for Kelly Racing and Shane van Gisbergen won the first race of his career.

The event hosted races 5 and 6 of the 2011 season. 2006 V8 Supercar champion Rick Kelly won the Saturday race from third on the grid in a mixture of wet and dry weather conditions. Paul Dumbrell did not participate in the race after a heavy crash at turn 3 in qualifying. Polesitter Jamie Whincup was caught out by the damp conditions, hitting the wall while exiting the pits and damaging the steering on his car. There were many incidents in the pit lane with cars failing to stop on the slippery concrete surface, running into pit crews and cameramen. Whincup's teammate Craig Lowndes finished second while Todd Kelly made it a double podium for Kelly Racing.

The Kelly brothers maintained their form through to Sunday's race, with Rick taking pole and Todd starting next to him on the front row after a rain affected qualifying session which saw only one flying lap for most of the drivers. Shane van Gisbergen won the first race of his career, holding off Lee Holdsworth in the closing stages of the race. Garth Tander finished on the podium after starting the race in 19th. Steve Owen recovered from a disastrous weekend in Adelaide by finishing in the top five. Whincup had another disappointing race and left the weekend with his championship lead almost halved, 81 points ahead of Rick Kelly.

Results
Results as follows:

Qualifying Race 5
Qualifying timesheet:

Race 5
Race timesheets:

Qualifying Race 6
Qualifying timesheet:

Race 6
Race timesheets:

Standings
 After 6 of 28 races.

References

ITM Hamilton
Hamilton 400
ITM
April 2011 sports events in New Zealand